Anton Strashimirov (Varna, 15 June 1872 – Vienna,  7 December 1937) was a Bulgarian author.

References

External links
 

1872 births
1937 deaths
Writers from Varna, Bulgaria
Radical Democratic Party (Bulgaria) politicians
Politicians from Varna, Bulgaria
Members of the National Assembly (Bulgaria)